The White Palace (Serbian: Бели двор, Beli dvor) is the official residence of the Yugoslav former royal family (the Royal House of Karageorgevich). It is located within the Royal Compound, in the Dedinje neighborhood of Belgrade. 

The palace was designed by architect Aleksandar Đorđević in a neo-Palladian style, inspired by 18th century English country houses such as Ditchley Park. Its interior was decorated with English Georgian and 19th century Russian antiques by the French design firm Maison Jansen, which later decorated the White House during the administration of John F. Kennedy.

History
The palace was commissioned by and built with the personal funds of King Alexander I for his three sons. Alexander was assassinated during a state visit to Marseille, France, in the same year that the construction of the palace began. Supervision of construction was overtaken by the Prince Regent Paul until its completion in 1937. Queen Maria and her three sons, including the 11-year-old King Peter II, continued to reside in the Royal Palace during this time. Prince Paul was the only member of the royal family to reside in the palace before the outbreak of the Second World War and subsequent invasion of Yugoslavia.

Following the end of the war, the new communist government seized the assets and property of the royal family. The White Palace was periodically used by president Josip Broz Tito and later by Slobodan Milošević for official state functions and foreign visits. Milošević received U.S. envoy Richard Holbrook at the palace before the NATO bombing of Yugoslavia began; Milošević later officially resigned his presidency in front of the palace fireplace.

The White Palace is open for public visitations on weekends during the tourist season from April to November.

The Royal Compound has also participated in tourism fairs in Belgrade and Novi Sad and during the Days of the European Cultural Heritage.

Art collection
The qualified tour guides at the Palace will tell any visitor that the White Palace's notable works of art include paintings by Piero di Cosimo, Biagio d'Antonio, Nicolas Poussin (3 works), Giovanni Cariani, Sébastien Bourdon, Albrecht Altdorfer, Titian, Rembrandt attribution, Palma Vecchio (2 paintings), Carlo Caliari, Peter Paul Rubens, Carel Fabritius, Simon Vouet, two paintings by Brueghel, Antonio Canaletto, Eugène Delacroix, Jean-Baptiste Carpeaux, Giuseppe Crespi, Nicolae Grigorescu, Franz Xaver Winterhalter, Eugène Fromentin, Gaspard Dughet, Richard Parkes Bonington, Đura Jakšić, Ivan Meštrović, Vlaho Bukovac and others.  The green and white Sèvres porcelain service was purchased in 1932 in Paris from the gallery Charpentier. The service once belonged to the Comte d'Artois.

There is also a library which had about 35,000 books

Lootings and theft
Many of the palace's works of art were looted by communist Partisans in 1944, following the liberation of Belgrade from German occupation. One of the looted pieces was the Rembrandt school's painting 'Quint Fabius Maximus'.

Selected works of art

Piero di Cosimo, Forest Fire
Domenico di Pace Beccafumi, Clelia's Escape (oil on panel, 64 cm x124cm)
Biagio d'Antonio, Madonna with Jesus and Angels
Albrecht Altdorfer, Madonna Dream: Taking Maria to the Temple
Andrea di Aloigi, The Worship of the Child (oil on panel,d.80 cm,c.1500)
Palma Vecchio, The Holy Family with St. Catherine, St. John and Donor (104x167cm,c.1510) and Self Portrait
Titian, Male Portrait
Carlo Caliari Decorating Bull
Bernardino Licinio, Portrait of Noble Woman
Giuseppe Crespi, Parable of the Prodigal Son
Nicolas Chaperon, Allegory composition ( 175 cm x 157 cm c.1640)
Nicolas Poussin, Adonis and Venus , Landscape with Three Monks (117x193cm)  and Landscape (drawing)
Sébastien Bourdon, Landscape with Remains'
Carel Fabritius attributed, Man with FlauteMelchior d'Hondecoeter, Different BirdsBrueghel, Vase with FlowersCharles Le Brun, Macedonian Army Battle (tapestry 355 x 354 cm)
Antonio Canaletto, Channel in VeniceAugustin Pajou, Portrait Bust of Countess di Bari (sculpture)
Eugène Delacroix, Toilete of Algerian Woman (aquarel, 35x29 cm)
Alexander Roslin, Portrait of Grand Duchess Maria FeodorovnaIvan Aivazovsky, Walking on the SeaJean-François Millet, Landscape with antique figures and beggersFranz Xaver Winterhalter, Portrait of Maria AlexandrovnaNicolae Grigorescu, Portrait of girl with red headscarfEmmanuel Frémiet, St.George and Dragon (sculpture bronze)
Ivan Bilibin, The Tale of the Golden Cockerel and Fairy Tale about Emperor SultaneGeorges Scott, Portrait of HM King Alexander I on the HorseJean Louis Deprez, Loggia of Imaginary PalaceFélix Ziem, Grande ChannelJean-Baptiste Carpeaux, African Female Slave (sculpture)
Vlastislav Hofman, Girl (1916)
Rihard Jakopič, Girl with the lambGojmir Anton Kos, GirlVlaho Bukovac, Purple Dream, The White SlavePaja Jovanović, Motive from Morocco and Portrait of King Alexander I KaradjordjevicIvan Meštrović, Sfinga, Njegoš, Miloš Obilić, Self Portrait''

References

External links

Official site of the Royal Family
Oplenac, The Mausoleum of the Royal Family
Aerial video of the Beli Dvor

Palaces in Serbia
Royal residences in Serbia
Buildings and structures in Belgrade
Buildings and structures completed in 1937
Karađorđević dynasty
Savski Venac